Huazhu Hotels Group Ltd (NASDAQ: HTHT；01179.HK )() is a hotel management company in China. In 2021, it was ranked the seven largest hotel group in the world.  As of June 2020, Huazhu Hotels Group operates 6,187 properties in 16 countries. It was previously known as Hanting Inns or China Lodging Group Limited. The company's head office is located in Minhang District, Shanghai.

History 
China Lodging was established in 2005. The original company, Powerhill, was established in 2005, and the current Huazhu company was established in 2007.

The first hotel of the group opened by Kunshan Railway Station for a trial operation in August 2005.

Ji Qi, the founder, stated that he got the idea to start the chain by reading a book discussing Accor. In 2012, the company had four brands and about 1,000 properties in China.

In March 2010, China Lodging was listed on NASDAQ.

In November 2012, the group was renamed to Huazhu Hotels Group.

In December 2014, Huazhu Hotels Group signed a long-term strategic alliance agreement with Accor in France, which was finalized in January 2016.

In May 2015, former president Jenny Zhang was appointed chief executive officer.

In August 2018, the company faced a major data breach, where millions of customer data was leaked and sold on the dark web.

In November 2019, the company announced that one of their subsidiaries purchased Deutsche Hospitality for 700 million euros.

Partnership with Accor 
On December 15, 2014, Huazhu signed a long-term strategic alliance agreement with Accor to jointly expand its hotel business in China. According to the agreement, Mercure, Novotel, Mercure, Ibis Style and Ibis will be operated by Huazhu in China and Mongolia.

Under franchise agreements, 300 economy and middle-scale hotels have opened in China, mainly under the Ibis, Novotel, and Mercure brands.

Purchase of Deutsche Hospitality 
China Lodging Holding Singapore, a wholly-owned subsidiary of Huazhu Hotels Group, has acquired 100% equity interest in Deutsche Hospitality (DH).

DH's major hotel brands include Steigenberger Hotels & Resort, Maxx by Deutsche Hospitality, IntercityHotel, Jaz in the City, and Zleep Hotels.

Financial results

See also

References
 Ruetz, David and Macy Marvel. "Budget Hotels: Low Cost Concepts in the U.S., Europe and Asia." In: Conrady, Roland and Martin Buck. Trends and Issues in Global Tourism 2011 (Volume 0 of Trends and Issues in Global Tourism). Springer Science & Business Media, February 4, 2011. Start p. 99. , 9783642177675.

Notes

External links

 Huazhu Hotels Group Ltd  - Site for all hotel brands
 China Lodging Group Limited (Investor site, in English)
 Hanting Inns 
 China Lodging Group, Ltd at Google Finance

Companies based in Shanghai
Chinese companies established in 2005
Hotels established in 2005
Hospitality companies of China
Hospitality companies
Hotel chains in China
Companies listed on the Nasdaq
Chinese brands
Hospitality companies established in 2005